The Hidden Valley Kings are a neighborhood-based gang in Charlotte, North Carolina. It was formed in the late 1990s, as a branch of the Queen City Kings, which started in the Cedar Greene housing complex, east of Hidden Valley, near the streets of Craighead and North Tryon.  The Queen City Kings were formed by a People Nation member who moved to Charlotte from Chicago in the mid 1990s. He initially established a People Nation faction in the Cedar Greene Apartment Complex but as a way to be inclusive of the growing Folk Nation influence within the growing Supreme King Queen Nation, an agreement was made by all parties involved to change the name of the gang to the Queen City Kings, which played on the nickname of the City of Charlotte, which people dub the "Queen City." The name, according to the Original Kings, was the gang's affirmation to the claiming of the city, stating: "The Queen City is our bitch, which makes us the Kings." Shortly thereafter, he was incarcerated on an unrelated offense. A Cedar Greene Apartments resident named "Korn," along with Korn's half-brother, was left in charge; Korn proved to be a very charismatic and dedicated leader, remaining loyal to the movement until his suicide, several years later. The Kings, which originally stood for Knowledgeable Islamic Nubian Gods, then renamed Krucial Islamic Nubian Gods,  was meant to be a Charlotte, home-grown version of the Chicago gangs. The Kings were structured similar to the Los Angeles gangs, but instead of "Original Gangsta" (OG) or "Baby Gangsta" (BG) the Queen City Kings used "Original King" (OK) or "Baby King" (BK). The Kings color is black but the Hidden Valley Kings wear the color green for their neighborhood, the Hidden Valley neighborhood sign is green and Hidden Valley Elementary school colors are green. Just as the nations in Chicago had different branches, or "sets," the Queen City Kings had a number of small sets as well. These sets were actually small groups of members who lived in different Charlotte communities, who were dedicated to spreading the Kingz to each of these neighborhoods. Some of them were successful but many of them were unknown in their respective neighborhoods. Among the factions were the Wilmore Kings (WMK), Tuckaseegee Kings (TSK), Beatties Ford Kings (BFK), Maple Run Kings (MRK), North Side Jamaican Kings (NJK), Westside Kings (WSK) the Creek Town Kings (CTK or FOC), The Cedar Greene Kings (CGK), the Woodview Kings (WVK),  the Hidden Valley Kings (HVK) among others of these various sets, the Hidden Valley Kings became the most prominent.

Eventually, the Hidden Valley Kings gained independence as a gang, as the original concept and philosophy of the Queen City Kings seemed to have died with Korn, the gangs former leader. Korn's half-brother began to get heavily involved in rap and radio (many of the Original Queen City Kings were actually aspiring rap artists, with a full LP to their credit), seemingly leaving the gang life behind. The HVK now represents themselves with black bandanas. In the 2000s the gang's activities consisted mainly of selling narcotics for profit, though Corn often stated that "There are many hustles outside of selling drugs." they began organizing the neighborhood, mimicking the Charlotte-Mecklenburg Police Department, dividing it into three zones. The Hidden Valley Kings don't have many known enemies, but within the neighborhood members have been known to have altercations with the United Blood Nation.

The Hidden Valley kings home base is the Hidden Valley Neighborhood located on the city's northeast side. A small fraction of the gang also dominate a few apartments on West Blvd. But majority of them hangout in their home base neighborhood.

On November 28, 2005, members of the Hidden Valley Kings ran into a rival drug dealer who refused to pay taxes at Eastland Mall. After a shootout in the mall's food court, the victim managed to escape. Later that night, the Kings lured the dealer into a local motel on North Tryon Street as they attempted to ambush the victim. Once again, the victim managed to escape. The Kings chased him down Tryon as the passengers of the two vehicles exchanged fire. After colliding with a telephone pole, the victim ran into a nearby neighborhood. After a brief chase, the Kings eventually caught up to the victim and while cornered, killed him, shooting him point-blank with an AK-47.

The brutal manner in which the murder occurred triggered the Charlotte-Mecklenburg Police Department to begin taking action against the gang. The department put together a Special Operations Unit to take down the Hidden Valley Kings. They gathered informants and followed the Kings for almost two years gathering information on how the gang operated. On March 30, 2007, more than one hundred task force agents cracked down on the Kings. They arrested over 20 Hidden Valley King members, including the leaders, on multiple charges.

References

Gangs in North Carolina
African-American gangs